Woccon may refer to:
the Waccamaw Siouan people
the Woccon language